Ezequiel Carlos Maggiolo (born June 15, 1977 in Martínez) is a retired Argentine football forward. He is currently the assistant coach of Tigre.

Career

Maggiolo started his career in the Argentine 3rd division in 1996, in 1998 the club were promoted to the 2nd division. In 1999 Maggiolo moved to Ecuador to play for LDU Quito where he won his first major title; the 1999 Campeonato Ecuatoriano de Fútbol.

In 2000 Maggiolo returned to Argentina to play for newly promoted side Club Atlético Los Andes, but the 2000-2001 season did not progress well and Los Andes finished bottom of the table to be relegated back to the 2nd division.

Maggiolo left Los Andes in the summer to join Estudiantes for his first spell with the club, he played for them between 2001 and 2005 before moving to Olimpo de Bahía Blanca for the 2005-2006 season. At the end of the season Olimpo finished 18th in the table necessitating a playoff with Belgrano de Córdoba, Olimpo lost the tie and Maggiolo experienced relegation from the Primera for the 2nd time in his career.

In 2006, Maggiolo was re–signed by the new Estudiantes manager Diego Simeone. He helped the club to win their first league title in 23 years, when it won the championship decider against Boca Juniors to claim the Apertura 2006 championship. Maggiolo made 12 appearances during the championship season, including a 20-minute substitute appearance in the 2-1 victory over Boca Juniors.

As of October 2007 19 of Maggiolo's 29 appearances have been as a substitute, thus distorting his goals per game average quite dramatically.

Titles

References

External links
 Argentine Primera statistics at Fútbol XXI 

Argentine footballers
Association football forwards
Club Atlético Tigre footballers
L.D.U. Quito footballers
Club Atlético Los Andes footballers
Estudiantes de La Plata footballers
Olimpo footballers
Indios de Ciudad Juárez footballers
Atlético Nacional footballers
Club Atlético Belgrano footballers
All Boys footballers
Ecuadorian Serie A players
Liga MX players
Argentine Primera División players
Categoría Primera A players
Argentine expatriate footballers
Expatriate footballers in Ecuador
Expatriate footballers in Colombia
Footballers from Buenos Aires
1977 births
Living people